The Peach Belt Conference women's basketball tournament is the annual conference women's basketball championship tournament for the Peach Belt Conference. The tournament has been held annually since 1992. It is a single-elimination tournament and seeding is based on regular season records.

The winner receives the conference's automatic bid to the NCAA Women's Division II Basketball Championship.

Results

Championship records

 Flagler have not yet reached the finals of the Peach Belt tournament.
 Montevallo and UNC Pembroke never reached the finals of the Peach Belt tournament before leaving the conference.
 Schools highlighted in pink are former members of the Peach Belt Conference

See also
 Peach Belt Conference men's basketball tournament

References

NCAA Division II women's basketball conference tournaments
Tournament
Recurring sporting events established in 1992